Murtosa is a town and a municipality in the District of Aveiro in Portugal. The population in 2011 was 10,585, in an area of 73.09 km2. It had 8,282 eligible voters.

The present Mayor is Joaquim Manuel Baptista, elected by the Social Democratic Party. The municipal holiday is September 8.

Numerous Murtosa residents have immigrated to Newark, New Jersey and other cities in the New York City metropolitan area of the United States. They have formed numerous social clubs and institutions in Newark and the broader region.

Economy
Agriculture, fishing and canned fish preserves industry are the main activities.

Demographics

Parishes
Administratively, the municipality is divided into 4 civil parishes (freguesias):
 Bunheiro
 Monte
 Murtosa
 Torreira

Cities and towns
There are no cities in Murtosa. There is at least one town, namely Murtosa.

Notable people 
 Francisco Maria da Silva (1910—1977) a Roman Catholic prelate,  Archbishop-Primate of Braga from 1963

References

External links

Town Hall official website

 
Municipalities of Aveiro District
Towns in Portugal